Mitsada Saitaifah (born 25 January 1987) is a footballer who plays as a midfielder. Born in France, he is a Laos national football team.

Career

In 2008, Saitaifah signed for French fourth tier side Romorantin. In 2012, he signed for Bourges 18 in the French fifth tier. In 2013, he signed for French fourth tier club Fontenay. In 2015, Saitaifah signed for Le Puy Foot in the French fifth tier, helping them earn promotion to the French fourth tier.

Before the 2016 season, he signed for Laotian team Lanexang United. Before the 2018 season, he signed for Pattani in the Thai fourth tier, helping them earn promotion to the Thai third tier. In 2021, Saitaifah signed for Thai third tier outfit Satun United.

References

External links
 

1987 births
Association football midfielders
Bourges 18 players
Championnat National 2 players
Championnat National 3 players
Expatriate footballers in Thailand
French expatriate footballers
French expatriate sportspeople in Thailand
French footballers
French people of Laotian descent
French sportspeople of Asian descent
Lanexang United F.C. players
Laos international footballers
Laotian expatriate footballers
Laotian expatriate sportspeople in Thailand
Laotian footballers
Le Puy Foot 43 Auvergne players
Mitsada Saitaifah
SO Romorantin players
Mitsada Saitaifah
Mitsada Saitaifah
Vendée Fontenay Foot players
Living people